Scottish Chileans are Chileans of Scottish descent who came from Scotland and, in some cases, Scots-Irish people from Northern Ireland. A large proportion of Scottish Chileans are sheep farmers in the Magallanes region of the far south of the country, and the city of Punta Arenas has a large Scottish foundation dating back to the 18th century.

A famous Scot, Thomas, Lord Cochrane (later 10th Earl of Dundonald) formed the Chilean Navy to help liberate Chile from Spain in the independence period. Chile developed a strong diplomatic relationship with Great Britain and invited more British settlers to the country in the 19th century.

The Chilean government land deals invited settlement from Scotland and Wales in its southern provinces in the 1840s and 1850s. The number of Scottish Chileans is still higher in Patagonia and Magallanes regions.

The Mackay School, in Viña del Mar is an example of a school set up by Scottish Chileans. The Scottish and other British Chileans are primarily found in higher education as well in economic management and the country's cultural life.

Easter Island
Scottish Chileans also played a prominent role in the annexation of Easter Island/Rapa Nui by Chile.

The Williamson-Balfour Company, a Scottish Chilean firm, controlled many aspects of island life, and in 1903 they created a subsidiary, Compania Explotadora de la Isla de Pascua (CEDIP), up until it was handed over to the Chilean Navy.

Scottish Chilean communities

There is the Gran Santiago metropolitan region; followed by the towns of Antofagasta, Chillan, Concepcion, Coquimbo, Iquique, Osorno, Puerto Aisen, Puerto Montt, Valdivia, Valparaíso and Viña del Mar.

Prominent Scottish-Chileans
 Ian Campbell
 Thomas Cochrane, 10th Earl of Dundonald
 María Edwards
 Sergio Livingstone, Chilean football goalkeeper.
 Enrique Mac Iver
 Agustín Ross
 Alexander Selkirk
 Andrés Wood, director

See also

 Scottish place names in Chile
 British Chilean

References 

European Chilean
 
Chilean